The Chadian National Gendarmerie is the branch of the Military of Chad in charge of judicial policing, administrative policing, and military policing. Created by decree of August 17, 1961 No. 2 following the independence of Chad, it was directly inspired by the French National Gendarmerie. In 2014, it had 8,500 soldiers.

Ranks

Officers

Enlisted

References

 
Chad
National police forces
Military units and formations established in 1961
Law enforcement agencies in Africa
Law enforcement in Chad